William Cheyne may refer to:

 William Cheyne (died 1420) (c. 1374–1420), MP for Dorset (UK Parliament constituency)
 William Cheyne (15th century MP) for Kent
 William Cheyne (judge) (d. 1443), English Chief Justice, 1424–1438
 Sir William Cheyne, 1st Baronet (1852–1932), British surgeon and bacteriologist
William Cheyne, 2nd Viscount Newhaven (1657–1728), MP for Amersham, Appleby and Buckinghamshire
 William Cheyne (footballer) (1912–1988), Scottish footballer for Rangers